The fourth season of the American science fiction television series Star Trek: Enterprise commenced airing on the UPN network in the United States on October 8, 2004 and concluded on May 13, 2005 after airing 22 episodes. Set in the 22nd century, the series follows the adventures of the first Starfleet starship Enterprise, registration NX-01. The fourth season saw changes made to the production team, with Manny Coto becoming the show runner. He had joined the team during the third season as a co-executive producer. Other changes included Star Trek novelists Judith and Garfield Reeves-Stevens being brought on board as writers.

Season four was the final season of the series, with the show being cancelled during the filming of the episode "In A Mirror, Darkly". Following the cancellation, fans of the show conducted protests and raised funds to pay for a fifth season, however their efforts were unsuccessful. "These Are The Voyages..." was the final episode of the series, and gained the highest number of viewers for the season according to Nielsen Media Research. Despite critics describing the fourth season in a warmer manner, the finale was received poorly, with Rick Berman later regretting the storyline. The series was nominated for three Emmy Awards for episodes in the fourth season, but the only award won was an Outstanding Visual Effects for a Broadcast Series at the 2005 Visual Effects Society awards.

Plot overview
Following the season-long Xindi arc during the third season, season four comprised several shorter story arcs. These included a wrap-up to the Temporal Cold War storyline which began with the pilot episode, "Broken Bow". Other arcs covered the differences between the Klingons seen in Enterprise as compared to those seen in series set later in the Star Trek timeline. One of the senior officers on the Enterprise is killed, during an Andorian story. The season also featured a greater number of references to Star Trek: The Original Series with Orion slave girls and genetically engineered humans similar to Khan Noonien Singh appearing in a story arc which also featured the return of Brent Spiner to the Star Trek franchise.

Cast

Main cast

Guest cast

Episodes

In the following table, episodes are listed by the order in which they aired.
<onlyinclude>{{Episode table |background=#C5B49A |overall=5 |season=5 |title=13 |aux1=12 |director=12 |writer=25 |airdate=12 |prodcode=7 |viewers=9 |country=U.S. |aux1T=Date |episodes=

{{Episode list/sublist|Star Trek: Enterprise (season 4)
  | EpisodeNumber   = 92
  | EpisodeNumber2  = 16
  | Title           = Divergence
  | Aux1            = Unknown
  | DirectedBy      = David Barrett
  | WrittenBy       = Garfield Reeves-Stevens & Judith Reeves-Stevens
  | OriginalAirDate = 
  | ProdCode        = 40358-092
  | Viewers         = 2.96
  | LineColor       = c5b49a
  | ShortSummary    = With the Columbia'''s help, the Enterprise crew grapples with sabotage to their ship as they pursue the truth behind the kidnapping of Phlox. The disease is cured, but genetic mutations will make many Klingons appear human-like for generations to come.
}}

}}
</onlyinclude>

Production

The series had been at risk of cancellation following the third season. But the rights holders, Paramount Television, reduced the cost per episode that it charged network UPN from $1.7 million per episode to $800,000. The broadcast schedule was subsequently changed and repeat episodes were moved to Friday nights at 8pm ET / 9pm PT, with season four making its debut in that timeslot on October 8, 2004. TV Guide described the new time slot as "where the network was drawing virtually no viewers with what one executive calls 'eighth runs of slasher movies'". Enterprise was not the first Star Trek series to be moved to a Friday night timeslot following a budget cut, as Star Trek: The Original Series for the third season was moved to a 10pm ET timeslot where it was subsequently cancelled. Manny Coto said the budget cuts were mostly offset by the cost savings of filming using digital cameras.

The fourth season also saw a change in the production team. Enterprise had previously been run by the show's creators, Rick Berman and Brannon Braga, who were also the executive producers. Manny Coto joined the production team during the third season as a co-executive producer following his work on the series Odyssey 5. His scripts were well received, having written such episodes as "Similitude". For the fourth season, Coto was credited as the show runner. He explained in an interview that "What's been publicized, that Rick and Brannon have stepped back and I've moved in, is not exactly true. I've kinda moved in with them, so to speak, so we're all three running the show. I'm actually more in charge of writing, I guess, dealing with the writers and the 'writing room,' coming up with stories that Rick and Brannon approve or not approve, or give notes on." He explained that the process was for the three of them to pitch stories together and work on fleshing them out.

Following Coto's appointment as executive producer, he also sought to make changes to the writing team. Judith and Garfield Reeves-Stevens joined the team, having been known previously for writing Star Trek novels. These books included collaborations with William Shatner on his Shatnerverse novels. Their first television episode written for Star Trek: Enterprise was the first part of the planned Vulcan story arc in season four, "The Forge". They went to write several further episodes during the course of the season, including "Observer Effect", "United", "Divergence" and "Terra Prime". The series continued linking with NASA, with astronauts Terry W. Virts and Michael Fincke appearing as engineers on board the Enterprise in the series finale.

Cancellation

It was announced on February 3, 2005 that Enterprise had been cancelled. The news was passed to the cast and crew on the sixth day of filming of the second part of "In a Mirror, Darkly". Following the broadcast of the final episode, "These Are the Voyages...", it was the first time in eighteen years that there were no new episodes of a Star Trek series scheduled for broadcast. Star Trek: Enterprise was the first live-action spin-off from The Original Series to last less than seven seasons. The end of series cast and crew party was held on April 13, 2005 at the Hollywood Roosevelt Hotel.

The President of Paramount Network Television, David Stapf, said that "The creators, stars and crew of Star Trek: Enterprise ambitiously and proudly upheld the fine traditions of the Star Trek franchise. We are grateful for their contributions to the legacy of Trek and commend them on completing nearly 100 exciting, dramatic and visually stunning episodes. All of us at Paramount warmly bid goodbye to Enterprise, and we all look forward to a new chapter of this enduring franchise in the future."

The cancellation of Enterprise was protested by fans of the series. Actions included around a hundred fans picketing the gates of Paramount Studios. The response to the cancellation was organised on websites such as TrekUnited.com. They raised money which was intended to be used for new Star Trek programming, with $48,000 raised within a month of the cancellation. The website sought to raise $32 million to pay for a full fifth season of the show, but failed to get close only gaining some $87,000 from general donors plus $3 million of anonymous donations from investors who work in the American spaceflight industry. Rallies were also held elsewhere around the world, and a full page advertisement supporting the show was taken out in the Los Angeles Times. The money was refunded after an unsuccessful campaign, with reportedly only one accidental contact between TrekUnited and Paramount.

Themes
The fourth season sought to be different from the previous series of Enterprise in the way that story arcs worked. In the earlier series there was the ongoing Temporal Cold War plot, with the Xindi attack at the end of the second season resulting in a seasonlong story arc during season three. Instead season four was split up into several smaller arcs which had been planned before the start of the season. The first of these arcs was a resolution to the long-running Temporal Cold War, with Braga stating that the intention was "to resolve [it]... once and for all". This would also mark the final appearance of the Suliban in Enterprise as they were tied into that storyline. The episodes wrapping up the cold war did not reveal the identity of the person from the future who was advising the Suliban. Braga explained in a preseason interview that "Well, we've been debating that for quite some time, and I'll leave that question open. We haven't decided yet. We have some ideas about him — or her — or it. But we haven't settled on any one identity yet. It's still a question mark." The identity of "future guy" was later revealed by Braga on Twitter as Archer from the future.

Brent Spiner returned to the Star Trek franchise, having previously played the character of Data in Star Trek: The Next Generation. In Enterprise he played the role of Dr. Arik Soong, an ancestor of Data's creator. Coto compared the character to Hannibal Lecter and talked about the fear that he inspired in the human authorities during the time of Enterprise due to Soong's actions involving illegal genetics. The storyline involved several references to The Original Series, such as the genetic supermen in the vein of Khan Noonien Singh as first seen in the episode "Space Seed" and later in the 1982 film, Star Trek II: The Wrath of Khan. The first episode of this Enterprise story arc also saw the reappearance of the Orion slave girls as seen in the first pilot of Star Trek, "The Cage". Coto credited this to his idea for the fourth season saying, "What I really wanted to do this season is make the episodes that I as a Star Trek fan would have to see. You know, as a fan of the original series, if I heard that they were doing the Orion slavers and the Eugenics Wars, I would have to be in front of that TV."

The producers also sought to resolve issues with the difference in Enterprise compared to the other series. One of these was the actions and attitudes of the Vulcans; Coto said that "there's a difference between the Vulcans of our era and the Vulcans of later eras. Our Vulcans lie, our Vulcans are monolithic, our Vulcans are not pacifistic." The Vulcan storyline seen in "The Forge", "Awakening" and "Kir'Shara" was compared to the Protestant Reformation by Coto. The arc also reintroduced the character of T'Pau, who was previously seen in The Original Series episode "Amok Time". For "Awakening", a younger version of the character was played by Kara Zediker.

Reception

Ratings
Following the move to a Friday evening timeslot, Enterprise was going up directly against episodes of Stargate SG-1 on the Sci Fi Channel. The overall ratings by Nielsen Media Research placed the show in 150th place for the season. The season opened with ratings of 2.0/4 percent for the first part of "Storm Front",  but the series lowest ratings were received for the mid season episode "Observer Effect". Five other episodes equalled the 2.0/4 percent ratings of "Storm Front" while "Cold Station 12", "The Augments" and "Kir'Shara" each received 2.1/4 percent ratings. The highest ratings of the seasons were received for the series finale, "These Are The Voyages...", which gained ratings of 2.4/4 percent. Rick Berman credited the falling ratings received by the series to a variety of elements saying, "The show certainly had a great start. It got very good reviews and it had a huge audience for the first half a dozen episodes and then it started to slip. I could take the blame for it. I could put the blame into the scripts. I could put the blame into franchise fatigue. I don’t know why it didn’t work."

Reviews
The links to The Original Series were seen as positive improvements to Star Trek: Enterprise by critics including elements such as the appearance of the Mirror Universe and the Orion slave girls. Other story arcs praised included the Augment arc with Brent Spiner and the return of the genetic supermen made famous by Ricardo Montalbán's Khan in The Original Series. Phillip Chung of AsianWeek bemoaned the loss of the show, because he felt that it had improved over time and due to the franchise's continued progressive stance in showing racial minorities outside of the normal stereotypes.

In 2019, CBR rated Season 4 of Star Trek: Enterprise as the 19th best of 31 seasons of all Star Trek shows at that time, and said although it was a strong season "there were some big misses."

"These Are the Voyages..."

The critical response to the final episode, "These Are the Voyages..." was mostly negative. For example, the Wisconsin State Journal described it as "hands down the worst series finale ever". The episode featured a holodeck simulation on the USS Enterprise (NCC-1701-D) from Star Trek: The Next Generation during the events of the episode "The Pegasus" and the return of Commander William Riker (Jonathan Frakes) and Counselor Deanna Troi (Marina Sirtis). It was written by Berman and Braga, who responded to negative criticism of the episode by saying "You have to remember that under normal circumstances most people probably would have thought this was a very cool episode because it has a great concept driving it". Berman later said that "I would have never done it if I had known how people were going to react."

Iain Miller of The Independent on Sunday criticised the appearance of the two The Next Generation characters in the finale, saying that "It was like watching a once great sprinter now gone to fat falling flat on their face while running for a bus." The review also compared the use of the holodeck in the episode as the Star Trek equal of the ninth season of Dallas, which was revealed to be a dream of Pam Ewing in the finale. Thomas Connor of The Chicago Sun-Times gave the finale half a star in his review, saying that the death of Charles "Trip" Tucker III was "the most anticlimactic and dramatically pointless death in the history of the franchise".

The Boston Herald described the episode as one of the best ways to disappoint fans during 2005, saying that it "turned out to be an inappropriate ode to Star Trek: The Next Generation." A preview of the episode in the Daily Herald by Ted Cox suggested that "it could never figure out if it was meant to appeal to devoted trekkies or a general audience. In alienating both, it appealed to neither."

Awards
Episodes from the fourth season of Enterprise received three nominations for the 2005 Emmy Awards. The hairdesign/stylist team were nominated for Outstanding Hairstyling For a Series for their work in the episode "In A Mirror, Darkly" but lost to the team on Deadwood. Vince Deadrick Jr was nominated for Outstanding Stunt Coordination for his work in the episodes "Borderland" and "Cold Station 12" but was beaten by Matt Taylor for 24. The third nomination was not for a specific episode, but for the overall season with the makeup team nominated for Outstanding Prosthetic Makeup For a Series, Miniseries, Movie Or a Special. The award went to HBO's The Life and Death of Peter Sellers. The series was nominated for Best Network Television Series at the 31st Saturn Awards, but the award went to Lost.

The second part of "Storm Front" was awarded the Outstanding Visual Effects for a Broadcast Series at the 2005 Visual Effects Society awards. Ronald D. Moore received the award on behalf of the production team. The dogfight over New York City seen in that episode was also nominated for Outstanding Created Environment in a Live Action Broadcast Program, but lost to the opening sequence of the television series Spartacus''.

Media information
Following the end of the series, the fourth season was released on DVD before the end of 2005. It was also included in a complete set containing all four seasons of the series.

References

External links
 Episode guide at StarTrek.com

Star Trek: Enterprise
Enterprise
2004 American television seasons
2005 American television seasons